The Johnson's SU-distribution is a four-parameter family of probability distributions first investigated by N. L. Johnson in 1949. Johnson proposed it as a transformation of the normal distribution:

 

where .

Generation of random variables

Let U be a random variable that is uniformly distributed on the unit interval [0, 1]. Johnson's SU random variables can be generated from U as follows:

 

where Φ is the cumulative distribution function of the normal distribution.

Johnson's SB-distribution 
N. L. Johnson firstly proposes the transformation :

 

where .

Johnson's SB random variables can be generated from U as follows:
 
 

The SB-distribution is convenient to Platykurtic distributions (Kurtosis).
To simulate SU, sample of code for its density and cumulative density function is available here

Applications 
Johnson's -distribution has been used successfully to model asset returns for portfolio management.
Johnson distributions are also sometimes used in option pricing, so as to accommodate an observed volatility smile; see Johnson binomial tree.

An alternative to the Johnson system of distributions is the quantile-parameterized distributions (QPDs). QPDs can provide greater shape flexibility than the Johnson system. Instead of fitting moments, QPDs are typically fit to empirical CDF data with linear least squares.

References

Further reading

( Preprint)

Continuous distributions